"Bad Old Days" was the  entry in the Eurovision Song Contest 1978, performed in English by Co-Co.

The song, written by Stephanie de Sykes and Stuart Slater was an uptempo love song, with the narrator recalling the 'bad old days' before they met their current partner.

At Eurovision
On the night of the final, 22 April, the song was performed eighth, following 's José Vélez with "Bailemos un vals" and preceding 's Carole Vinci with "Vivre". At the close of voting, it had received 61 points, placing 11th in a field of 20.

At the time, this was the worst showing yet for the UK in Eurovision, surpassing the 9th place from 1966 which until 1978 had held the dubious distinction. "Bad Old Days" held the ignominious title until 1987, when the UK finished 13th. Of all the UK entries submitted from 1975-1993, this was the only UK song that did not receive either a 12 or a 10 point score at least once in the voting sequence. The highest score awarded to "Bad Old Days" was 8 points from Germany.

"Bad Old Days" was succeeded as British representative at the 1979 contest by Black Lace with "Mary Ann".

Charts
The single reached No.13 in the UK during a seven-week chart run. The song entered the UK Singles Chart at no.39 for the week the contest was staged. In the following week, it rose rapidly to no.16. Its eventual peak of 13 occurred three weeks after their failure in the contest. It was to be the group's only hit.

References

Eurovision songs of the United Kingdom
Eurovision songs of 1978
Ariola Records singles
Hansa Records singles
1978 songs
1978 singles
Songs written by Stephanie de Sykes